The Australian Greens Victoria, commonly known as the Victorian Greens or just as The Greens,  is the Victorian state member party of the Australian Greens, a green political party in Australia.

History

Early years 

The Australian Greens Victoria was formed in 1992, as a response to the formation of the Australian Greens which united pre-existing Green parties in Tasmania, New South Wales, Queensland and the ACT. The first election the Greens contested in Victoria was the 1993 federal election. The party contested the seat of La Trobe.

They first made an impact in 1994 with two outstanding by-election results: 21% in Coburg and 28% in Kooyong. They were among the best results ever achieved by a small party in Australian history.

With  greatly increased membership after these successes, the Party tackled the 1996 federal election. Despite Peter Singer as a lead Senate candidate, they achieved only 2.9% of the vote statewide, largely because of a strong Democrats campaign led by Cheryl Kernot. Within a month of the federal election, the Greens took on both many local elections and a general state election.

The Greens had high hopes for their lead Senate candidate at the 1998 federal election. Charmaine Clarke would have been the first Aboriginal woman elected to any parliament in Australia, as well as the first out lesbian elected to Canberra. However, their vote slipped back to 2.5% in an election dominated by One Nation and GST.

1999 onwards 

In March 1999 barrister David Risstrom was elected to the Melbourne City Council, following numerous local government campaigns in Victoria. Risstrom was re-elected in 2001 and retired in 2004 in order to contest the Senate in the Australian national elections of that year. Fraser Brindley, previously elected to Moreland City Council as a Greens representative in 2002, ran successfully for Melbourne City Council in 2004.

The first Greens candidate in Australia to be elected in a single-member electorate was Gurm Sekhon, elected to Yarra City Council in 2001. In 2002 Sekhon was re-elected and three more Greens were elected to Yarra City Council, giving the Greens 4 out of 9 seats on Council. In 2003 Yarra City Councillor Greg Barber became Australia's first Greens Mayor. Janet Rice was elected to Maribyrnong City Council in 2003 with a primary vote of 42%.

In 2005 Janet Rice was re-elected to a second term at Maribyrnong City Council and subsequently became Mayor. David Jones was elected to and became Mayor the City of Greater Bendigo, and a total of 14 Green local government councillors held office across Victoria, in Cities or Shires of Melbourne, Yarra, Maribyrnong, Moreland, Moonee Valley, Yarra Ranges, Whitehorse, Brimbank, Mount Alexander and Greater Bendigo.

In the yearly mayoral elections in 2006, Greater Bendigo Councillors elected back to back Green Mayors by electing Julie Rivendell to succeed David Jones, and Ben Opie was elected as Moonee Valley's first, and Victoria's fifth Green Mayor. In the Mayoral vote for 2007-8 Bendigo elected Cr David Jones again, making him the First Green Mayor to serve two terms and Bendigo to become the first council in Australia to have three Green Mayors.

The 2008 local government elections saw the first elections of Greens Councillors into Darebin, Glen Eira, Manningham, Queenscliffe, Surf Coast and Casey Councils, and saw Samantha Dunn re-elected in a single-member ward in Yarra Ranges with a strong 53% primary vote. Three Green mayors were elected following the elections: Amanda Stone in Yarra, Philip Schier in Mount Alexander, and Helen Harris in Whitehorse. Philip Schier was re-elected in 2009, and Bill Pemberton became Mayor of Whitehorse. Alison Clarke was the 2011 Greens Mayor of the City of Yarra.

Significant advances at the 2012 Local government elections including the election of Councillors for the first time to the City of Ballarat (Belinda Coates) and the City of Greater Dandenong (Matthew Kirwan).

Local government elections in 2016 returned the highest ever number of Green Councillors across Victoria, rising from 17 to 29.  This included first-time breakthroughs with the election of Josh Fergeus in Monash, Peter Castaldo in Banyule, Michael Schilling in Cardinia, and Jonathon Marsden in Hobsons Bay, who went on to become the first Greens mayor of Hobsons Bay for 2019.

In 2020, local elections raised the number of elected Greens councillors from 29 to 36, including three out of nine in Darebin, four out of eleven in Merri-bek, and five out of nine in Yarra, the first jurisdiction in Australia to have a majority Green chamber.

Structure

State leaders
On Saturday 12 November 2005 at the national conference in Hobart the Australian Greens abandoned their long-standing tradition of having no official leader and approved a process whereby a parliamentary leader could be elected by the Greens Parliamentary Party Room. The Victorian division of the party announced Greg Barber as the inaugural leader of the party in December 2010.

State Council
Decisions affecting the state party are made through the State Council, a meeting that consists of a delegate from each local branch. In some cases, a delegate may represent more than a single branch.

The State Council is the highest decision-making body, and controls election campaigns, sets the policy for the state party and decides on admitting new local branches to the Victorian Greens.

State Council also convenes a Disputes Panel, which is responsible for overseeing investigations and acting on disputes lodged to it by party members against other members and bodies within the party.

Branches
Local branch catchment areas are based on local government area boundaries. Branches control a significant portion of campaign activity, both during elections and outside of election periods, and are also responsible for fundraising efforts and local membership engagement. In recent years, control of election campaigns, particularly at the State and Federal level, and to a lesser extent the Local level, has become increasingly centralised thus reducing the amount of input that local branches have over their election campaigns.

Branches are also responsible for vetting and approving, deferring or rejecting new party members (a power State Council also has) and are generally responsible for local membership engagement; though branches don't have the power to suspend or expel members. A member residing within a branch catchment area is generally registered to that branch, while a member residing outside of any branch catchment area is considered "at-large", unless a member asks to be moved into another branch. Though members can be involved in more than one branch at a time, they can only be registered as members, and thus have voting power, within a single branch.

In addition, branches can establish working groups and subcommittees to specialise in specific interest areas, tasks, and campaigns.

Each branch elects Office Bearers consisting of at least a Convenor, Treasurer and Secretary, as well as a State Council delegate.

Campaign committees
Branches have the power, during election periods, to establish campaign committees, which may involve representatives from a single branch or delegates from multiple branches within an electorate area, as a means of centralising and coordinating campaign decisions within that electorate area for the duration of the election period. This includes decisions relating to fundraising and campaign spending.

Candidate preselections
Candidates for election, at all levels, are chosen by input of party members. Local Government, State lower house and House of Representatives candidates are preselected by a ballot of members residing only within those electorate, while state upper house lead candidates are decided by a ballot of all party members residing in the respective electoral region. Federal Senate lead candidates are decided by a ballot of members across the whole state.

Working groups
A variety of working groups have been established by the State Council, which are directly accessible to all Greens members. Working groups perform an advisory function by developing policy, conducted issues-based campaigns, or by performing other tasks assigned by the State Council. These include:
 Victorian Young Greens
 Green Women's Network
 Queer Greens Victoria
 Multicultural Greens Victoria
 Country Greens Victoria

Electoral results

State elections 

Three Greens representatives were elected to the Victorian Legislative Council at the 2006 state election. Greg Barber won a seat in the Northern Metropolitan Region, Colleen Hartland won a seat in the Western Metropolitan Region after a recount, and Sue Pennicuik won a seat in the Southern Metropolitan Region.

Minor parties have had little or no success in state lower houses that have single-member electorates, though in other states where there are multiple-member electorates in the lower house (such as Tasmania's or the ACT's), or where there are multiple-member electorate/s in the upper house (such as in NSW, SA and WA), minor parties including the Greens have been more successful. Up to and including the 2002 state election, Victoria's Legislative Council had double-member electorates, though, starting from the  2006 state election, Victoria's upper house had 8 electorates of 5 members each.

In the Legislative Assembly , Greens candidates were second in four two-party-preferred races in inner-city seats at the 2002 and 2006 state elections, three of which are now marginal seats (that is, they require less than a 5% swing to change hands). Richard Di Natale came within 2% of winning Melbourne from Labor cabinet minister Bronwyn Pike in 2002 and 2006.

The 2010 State elections saw another increase in the Greens vote - a 1.2% swing to give a primary vote of 11.21% with all three MLCs re-elected. The Liberal party directed voters to preference the ALP ahead of the Greens. The Greens' primary vote increased slightly overall from 10.04% to 10.6% of the overall vote, but the party did not win any lower-house seats. Federal Greens leader Bob Brown said of the result that it was positive but that: "The Liberals' preferencing to Labor means that instead of there being three Greens in the new parliament there won't be".

At the 2012 Melbourne state by-election, the Greens increased their two-candidate-preferred vote from 43.8 percent to 48.5 percent.

At the 2014 state election, the Victorian Greens won their first seats in the Victorian Legislative Assembly with Ellen Sandell elected in Melbourne and Sam Hibbins in Prahran. The victory in Prahran was the first time that the Greens have won a single member constituency at the state or federal level from the Liberal Party anywhere in Australia. Nina Springle and Samantha Dunn also won two extra Legislative Council Seats giving the party a total of 5 seats in the upper house.

The Greens gained a third seat in the Victorian Legislative Assembly at the 2017 Northcote state by-election, which was won by Lidia Thorpe.

In the 2018 state election, the Greens lost Northcote to Labor MP Kat Theophanous, but they held the seats of Melbourne and Prahran and picked up the seat of Brunswick, retaining 3 seats in the lower house. In the upper house the party suffered a near-wipeout, as its primary vote went slightly backwards and it became the victim of complex preference deals that benefited other minor parties and saw only leader Samantha Ratnam retain her seat.

In the 2022 state election, the Greens retained the seats of Brunswick, Melbourne and Prahran, and gained the seat of Richmond with a 12.9% swing from Labor.

Federal elections 

Ethicist and animal liberation activist Peter Singer was the lead candidate for the Victorian Greens during the 1996 federal election, in which the Greens polled a total of 1.90% in the House of Representatives and 2.94% in the Senate. Since then the Victorian Greens' vote has grown with 8.17% of the vote in the lower house at the 2007 federal election.

David Risstrom left the MCC to contest a Victorian Senate seat in the 2004 federal election. He received 8.80% of the primary vote, but was unable to make the quota of 14.3%. Had he received a high preference from the Australian Labor Party, he would have done so, but they instead directed preferences to the Family First Party's Steve Fielding, who was elected with 1.76% of the primary vote.

In 2007 Richard Di Natale ran as the lead Victorian Senate candidate and again the Greens narrowly missed out on a quota, with a Senate vote of 10.08%

The 2007 election also saw an historic result in the Division of Melbourne, where Greens candidate Adam Bandt won 22.8% of the primary vote and came second on a two party preferred basis, with 45.29% of the 2PP vote, the highest result ever for the Australian Greens in any seat at a federal election. Melbourne, traditionally one of the safest Labor seats in the country, became a marginal seat leading into the 2010 federal election.

In 2010 the Greens vote in Victoria rose to 12.66%, a swing of 4.49%. Richard Di Natale was elected to the Senate with a Senate vote of 14.64%, a swing of 4.56%, and Adam Bandt was elected to the Division of Melbourne with a primary vote of 36.17% (56.04% TPP).

At the 2013 federal election Adam Bandt retained his seat of Melbourne with 42.62% of the primary vote (55.27% on a two candidate basis). Former Mayor of Maribyrnong City Council, Janet Rice, was elected to the Senate and joined Richard Di Natale to become Victoria's second Greens senator. She won 10.77% of the vote which increased above a quota after distribution of preferences.

At the 2016 federal election Adam Bandt was re-elected to a third term in his seat of Melbourne with 43.75% of the primary vote (68.48% on a two-party preferred basis). Australian Greens leader Richard Di Natale and Janet Rice were re-elected to the Senate.

At the 2019 federal election Adam Bandt was re-elected to a fourth term in his seat of Melbourne with 49.3% of the primary vote (71.8% on a two-party preferred basis). Janet Rice was also re-elected to the Senate.

Members of Parliament

Federal Parliament

Former
 Senator Richard Di Natale (2011–2020)
 Senator Lidia Thorpe (2020–2023)

State Parliament

Former state members
 Greg Barber MLC (2006–2017)
 Colleen Hartland MLC (2006–2018)
 Sue Pennicuik MLC (2006–2018)
 Samantha Dunn MLC (2014–2018)
 Nina Springle MLC (2014–2018)
 Huong Truong MLC (2017–2018)
 Lidia Thorpe MLA (2017–2018)

References

External links 

The Green Agenda,   The Age, 9 November 2006
Inside the Green Zone The Age, 23 November 2010

Victoria
Political parties in Victoria (Australia)